The American Bar Association Medal (or ABA Medal) is the highest award given by the American Bar Association for "exceptionally distinguished service by a lawyer or lawyers to the cause of American jurisprudence." The ABA Board of Governors chooses the medal's recipient. The medal was authorized at the 50th anniversary meeting of the ABA in 1928. The first medal was given in 1929 and it has been given most, but not all, years since.

The medal itself was designed by Laura Gardin Fraser. It is four inches in diameter, made of 24K gold, later reduced to 14K gold. On the obverse is a profile of John Marshall with the inscription "To the end it may be a government of laws and not of men," from the Constitution of Massachusetts. On the reverse is "Justitia" with a likeness of Lady Justice.

List of recipients
Source: "Recipients of the American Bar Association Medal" at the American Bar Association website

 1929 Samuel Williston
 1930 Elihu Root
 1931 Oliver Wendel Holmes
 1932 John Henry Wigmore
 1934 George Woodward Wickersham
 1938 Herbert Harley
 1939 Edgar Bronson Tolman
 1940 Roscoe Pound
 1941 George Wharton Pepper
 1942 Charles Evans Hughes
 1943 John J. Parker
 1944 Hatton W. Sumners
 1946 Carl McFarland
 1947 William L. Ransom
 1948 Arthur T. Vanderbilt
 1950 Orie L. Phillips
 1951 Reginald Heber Smith
 1952 Harrison Tweed
 1953 Frank E. Holman
 1954 George Maurice Morris
 1956 Robert G. Storey
 1957 William Clarke Mason
 1958 E. Smythe Gambrell
 1959 Greenville Clark
 1960 William A. Schnader
 1961 Jacob Mark Lashly
 1962 Tom C. Clark
 1963 Felix Frankfurter
 1964 Henry S. Drinker
 1965 Edmund M. Morgan
 1966 Charles S. Rhyne
 1967 Roger J. Traynor
 1968 J. Edward Lumbard
 1969 Walter V. Schaefer
 1970 Frank C. Haymond
 1971 Whitney North Seymour
 1972 Harold Gallagher
 1973 William James Jameson
 1974 Ross L. Malone
 1975 Leon Jaworski
 1976 Bernard G. Segal
 1977 Edward L. Wright
 1978 Erwin N. Griswold
 1979 Lewis F. Powell, Jr
 1981 Chesterfield Smith
 1982 Earl F. Morris
 1984 Robert W. Meserve
 1986 Justin A. Stanley
 1987 Warren E. Burger
 1988 F. Wm. McCalpin
 1989 Wm. Reece Smith, Jr.
 1990 A. Sherman Christensen
 1991 Robert B. McKay
 1992 Thurgood Marshall
 1993 Randolph W. Thrower
 1994 William J. Brennan, Jr.
 1995 Shirley M. Hufstedler
 1996 John Minor Wisdom
 1997 Sandra Day O'Connor
 1998 Morris Harrell
 1999 John H. Pickering
 2000 Oliver W. Hill
 2001 Robert MacCrate
 2002 William H. Webster
 2003 Talbot "Sandy" D'Alemberte
 2004 Father Robert F. Drinan
 2005 George Leighton 
 2006 Jerome J. Shestack 
 2007 Anthony M. Kennedy
 2008 Patricia M. Wald
 2009 William H. Gates, Sr.
 2010 Ruth Bader Ginsburg
 2011 David Boies and Theodore B. Olson
 2012 Morris Seligman Dees, Jr.
 2013 Hillary Clinton
 2014  General Earl E. Anderson
 2015  Roberta Cooper Ramo
 2016  Dennis Archer
 2017  John Feerick
 2018  Bryan Stevenson
 2019  Dale Minami
 2020  William H. Neukom

References

Lifetime achievement awards
Awards established in 1929
Legal awards